The Iron Patriot is a patriotism-themed exoskeleton used by several fictional characters appearing in American comic books published by Marvel Comics.

Publication history
The concept of the Iron Patriot, which is meant to evoke Iron Man and Captain America, first appeared in Dark Avengers #1 (March 2009) and was created by Brian Michael Bendis and Mike Deodato.

Fictional history

Norman Osborn

Norman Osborn donned the original Iron Patriot armor during the Dark Reign storyline to exert his authority as "commander" of H.A.M.M.E.R. and the Dark Avengers while using Oscorp's resources. However, the Iron Patriot's star-shaped Uni Beam projector had a less powerful output. Unsurprisingly, Osborn's activities as the Iron Patriot have been jeopardized by the original Avengers: Osborn gets tricked into attacking Tony Stark, and when the New Avengers led by Captain America used the Iron Patriot's tracking device on Luke Cage as a trick to destroy his own house. During Osborn's invasion of Asgard on the grounds of a national security threat, the Iron Patriot is disabled during Osborn's fight with Steve Rogers, revealing Osborn's Green Goblin-like face paint. When Rogers, Stark and Thor transfer him to the Raft penitentiary, Osborn blames his Goblin alter-ego for ruining his chance to protect America as the Iron Patriot.

James Rhodes

James Rhodes temporarily wore the Iron Patriot armor during the Iron Patriot series.

Sarah Garza

Sarah Garza is an Inhuman who able to generate powerful explosions of energy with her Iron Patriot armor used as a regulator suit, and a rookie member to the Secret Avengers.

Toni Ho

Dr. Toni Ho wore two versions of her own Iron Patriot armor as a member of the U.S. Avengers; a standard version, and a heavy combat variation.

Sharon Carter

Sharon Carter briefly wore the Iron Patriot armor to combat Selene.

Reception

Accolades 
 In 2018, CBR.com ranked the Iron Patriot 11th in their "15 Strongest War Machine Suits" list.
 In 2022, CBR.com ranked the Iron Patriot 10th in their "10 Best Suits Of Armor In Comics" list.

Other versions

American Son
The American Son is another patriotic-themed exoskeleton used by Harry Osborn during the "Dark Reign" storyline, and later by Gabriel Stacy.

Iron Patriot Drones
The Iron Patriot Drones make occasional appearances. 

One is seen during the Fear Itself storyline to assists the New Avengers, but the Iron Patriot is vaporized by the Red Skull's powers.

Another is seen during the Marvel NOW! event. At a weapons expo, the Iron Patriot now has a low-level A.I. and ends up stolen by A.I.M. for the Scientist Supreme's plans, but is almost interrupted by Nick Fury Jr. and Daisy Johnson. An Iron Patriot army of sentient drones controlled by Marvin Flumm were used to incriminate the United States in international attacks, such as a framed attack on Iran where the Hulk is sent in response. S.H.I.E.L.D. uses holographic communication to hack into the A.I.M. network so the Iron Patriot Drones can understand these programmed actions are wrong.

The Iron Patriot Drones are next seen during the "Inhumanity" storyline as the Secret Avengers' support. However, one is seen during the Iron Patriot series where it is utilized by Terrence Rhodes.

Iron Hulk
The Iron Hulk is an alias used by Robert Maverick / Red Hulk.

Hydra Supreme / Civil Warrior
A variation of Steve Rogers utilized elements of Tony Stark's armor in order to control Hydra as the Hydra Supreme / Civil Warrior. The armor would later be utilized by Veronica Eden.

Ultimate Marvel
The Ultimate Marvel equivalent of the Iron Patriot appears due to Tony Stark / Iron Man inspired by Steve Rogers / Captain America for the Ultimates.

In other media

Television
 The Norman Osborn incarnation of Iron Patriot and Harry Osborn as the Patrioteer appear in Ultimate Spider-Man, voiced by Steven Weber and Matt Lanter respectively.
 The Iron Patriot armor makes sporadic appearances in Avengers Assemble in which several versions are used by different individuals, such as Tony Stark and Steve Rogers.

Film
 The second Iron Patriot armor appears in Iron Man and Captain America: Heroes United (2014), in which it is used by Steve Rogers. 
 The Iron Patriot armor appears in films set in the Marvel Cinematic Universe. First appearing in Iron Man 3 (2013), this version is primarily used by James Rhodes, but it is used by Eric Savin to capture President Matthew Ellis. Additionally, a heavy combat version appears in Avengers: Endgame (2019).

Video games
 The original incarnation of Iron Patriot appears as an alternate skin in Ultimate Marvel vs. Capcom 3.
 The Norman Osborn and second incarnations of Iron Patriot appear as playable characters in Marvel Super Hero Squad Online.
 The second incarnation of Iron Patriot appears in Marvel: Avengers Alliance.
 The second incarnation of Iron Patriot appears in Iron Man 3: The Official Game. 
 The second incarnation of Iron Patriot armor appears as an alternate skin in Marvel Heroes.
 The second incarnation of Iron Patriot appears in Lego Marvel Super Heroes. 
 The Norman Osborn incarnation of Iron Patriot appears as a playable character in Marvel Puzzle Quest.
 The second incarnation of Iron Patriot appears in Disney Infinity 2.0.
 The Norman Osborn incarnation of Iron Patriot appears as a playable character in Marvel Contest of Champions. Additionally, the Iron Hulk armor also appears in the game utilized by the Maestro. 
 The Norman Osborn incarnation of Iron Patriot appears as a playable character in Marvel: Future Fight. Additionally, the second incarnation of Iron Patriot appears as an unrelated alternate skin.
 The second incarnation of Iron Patriot appears in Lego Marvel's Avengers.
 The second incarnation of Iron Patriot appears as an alternate skin in Marvel Avengers Academy. 
 The second incarnation of Iron Patriot appears as an alternate skin in Iron Man VR.

References

External links
 Iron Patriot at Marvel Wiki
 American Son at Marvel Wiki

Marvel Comics superheroes
Iron Man
Captain America
Fictional armour
S.H.I.E.L.D. agents
United States-themed superheroes